Varicopeza crystallina is a species of sea snail, a marine gastropod mollusk in the family Cerithiidae.

Distribution
Locally abundant in some dredge-hauls, off West coast Barbados, Antilles
in 150-180 m. depth

Description 
The maximum recorded shell length is 19 mm.

Habitat 
Minimum recorded depth is 11 m. Maximum recorded depth is 1605 m.

References

External links

Cerithiidae
Gastropods described in 1881